Polydendri (Greek: Πολυδένδρι, English: "Many trees") is a town and former community of East Attica, Greece. Since the 2011 local government reform it is part of the municipality Oropos, of which it is a municipal unit. It is part of Athens metropolitan area. Polydendri has historically been an Arvanite settlement.

Geography 
It is located north of Athens. Polydendri is at an altitude of 340 meters. The town contains no more than 1,385 residents (2011 census) and it has many cultural unions, such as a youth union, a traditional dance union, an athletic club (the "Black Eagle of Polydendri" playing at the athletic center of Gourezi), a tracking club and a heavy metal society (called "the Obscure" and numbering 1.500 members from all around Greece). Furthermore, Polydendri is known for its taverns.

The postal code of Polydendri is 19014 and its telephone access code is +3022950. The municipal unit has a land area of 13.881 km2 and also includes the villages of Taxiárches (pop. 116), Irakleideís (68), and Ágios Geórgios (39). Its total population was 1,608 at the 2011 census.

References

Oropos
Populated places in East Attica
Arvanite settlements